Omar Pedro Méndez Gulvenzu (born 7 August 1934) is a Uruguayan football forward who played for Uruguay in the 1954 FIFA World Cup. He also played for Club Nacional de Football and he succeeded in Ferro Carril Oeste, in Argentina in 1958.

References

1934 births
Uruguayan footballers
Uruguay international footballers
Association football forwards
Uruguayan Primera División players
Club Nacional de Football players
1954 FIFA World Cup players
Living people